Digital Scholarship in the Humanities is a peer-reviewed academic journal of the European Association for Digital Humanities that covers all aspects of computing and information technology applied to Arts and Humanities research. It is one of the main journals in the field of Digital Humanities. The journal is published by Oxford University Press. The journal was formerly known as Literary and Linguistic Computing, but was renamed to emphasise a broadening in its subject focus beyond literary studies.

References

External links 
 

Digital humanities
Publications established in 1986
Multidisciplinary humanities journals
English-language journals
Quarterly journals